is a Fukui Railway Fukubu Line railway station located in the city of Sabae, Fukui Prefecture, Japan.

Lines

Station layout
The station consists of one ground-level side platform serving a single bi-directional track. The station is unattended. However, during special events (such as Suribachiyaito and the Azalea Festival during Golden Week) the station is staffed during midday, and some express trains bound for Fukui-Ekimae make stops.

Adjacent stations

History
It was renamed Nishiyama-Kōen Station on April 10, 1987.

Passenger statistics
In fiscal 2015, the station was used by an average of 37 passengers daily (boarding passengers only).

Surrounding area
Nishiyama Park and the Nishiyama Zoo are a short walk west from the station.
Sabae City Hall and the Citizens' Center are also nearby.

See also
 List of railway stations in Japan

References

External links

  

Railway stations in Japan opened in 1929
Fukui Railway Fukubu Line
Sabae, Fukui